"Unstoppable" is a single by American singer Kat DeLuna from the soundtrack to the 2009 film, Confessions of a Shopaholic. It was released on January 22, 2009 through Universal/Motown and Konvict Muzik, and was released to American radio stations on February 24, 2009. The single/video version features rapper Lil Wayne. Some radio stations had already premiered the song before the video release. The single has been featured in frequent WNBA commercials. Besides working with Wayne, DeLuna also once again worked alongside RedOne, the mastermind behind her debut album 9 Lives.

Music video
The music video for "Unstoppable" premiered on DeLuna's Myspace profile on January 23, 2009. The video features shots of DeLuna wearing blue, pink and black. There are also scenes with her on a motorcycle with Lil Wayne. Wayne is also found holding his signature Gibson ES-135 and singing into a microphone.

Versions
There are two versions of "Unstoppable". The version with Lil Wayne was released as a single.

Charts

References

External links 
 
 

2008 songs
2009 singles
Song recordings produced by RedOne
Kat DeLuna songs
Lil Wayne songs
Songs written by Lil Wayne
Songs written by RedOne
Songs written by Kinnda
Universal Motown Records singles
Konvict Muzik singles